Journal of American-East Asian Relations (JAEAR), according to its website, is a "peer-reviewed quarterly journal of interdisciplinary historical, cross-cultural, and social science scholarship from all parts of the world," which began publication in 1992. The scope includes diplomatic, economic, security, and cultural relations, as well as Asian-American history. Geographical coverage includes the United States, Canada, other countries in the Americas, and East Asia, typically China, Japan, and Korea, but also the Pacific area, Australasia, Southeast Asia, and the Russian Far East.

JAEAR is indexed and abstracted in more than thirty services. and is listed as a "fast track" journal by the Bibliography of Asian Studies.

Origins and history
Although JAEAR published its first issue in 1992, its roots date from the late 1960s, when many Americans were concerned about their country's engagement in Vietnam. Critical scholars of Asia, such as those in the Committee of Concerned Asian Scholars, charged that their profession had failed its intellectual duties and that Asianists had slighted their political responsibilities. In partial response, the American Historical Association set up a Committee on American-East Asian Relations. The chair was Ernest R. May, a diplomatic historian. Other members were John Fairbank, a China scholar, also at Harvard, whose goal as early as the 1930s had been to educate the American public about the “Far Eastern Crisis,” and Dorothy Borg, an Independent Scholar who had worked for the Institute of Pacific Relations in the 1940s. Younger members of the Committee included Akira Iriye and James C. Thomson, Jr., students of Fairbank and May, and Warren I. Cohen, then at Michigan State University. The Committee by 1990 had become inactive but the number of scholars in the field increased.

Anthony Cheung, who had been Iriye’s graduate student at University of Chicago but dropped out to work at University of Chicago Press, then founded an independent publishing house in Chicago, Imprint Publications. Cheung convinced Iriye, Cohen, and May that the field could support a journal to carry on the work of the Committee. JAEAR also received early support from Frank Gibney, who established the Pacific Basin Institute in Claremont, California. The first issue appeared in spring 1992.

In 2012, Brill Publishers, headquartered in Leiden, Netherlands bought JAEAR from Imprint Publications. JAEAR is now published both in hard copy and online, and more than thirty services index or abstract the journal.

Mission and significance
JAEAR first appeared at a time when scholars in American-East Asian relations were confident that their field was on the "cutting edge." Ernest R. May, who would become a sponsor of the journal, told the first conference of the Committee on American-East Asian Relations in 1971 that “politically and economically Americans and Asians have become almost as interdependent as Americans and Europeans,” but “do not, however have any understanding of one another comparable to the understanding – faulty though it often is – between Americans and Europeans.”   Warren I. Cohen, another who would become an early sponsor, in his 1985 address as president of the Society for Historians of American Foreign Relations touted the field of American-East Asian relations as a model and insisted that it was on was on the “cutting edge” of historical scholarship.

Early volumes included theme issues on a wide range of topics and in a wide range of disciplines.

See also
 East Asia–United States relations

Notes

References and further reading

External links
Official website
 Archives at JSTOR

History of the United States journals
International relations journals
Quarterly journals
Publications established in 1992
English-language journals
Brill Publishers academic journals
Asian studies journals